Yasunori Okuda  (born August 8, 1972) is a Japanese mixed martial artist. He competed in the Middleweight division.

Mixed martial arts record

|-
| Loss
| align=center| 2-6
| Jutaro Nakao
| TKO (punches)
| Shooto - Vale Tudo Junction 1
| 
| align=center| 1
| align=center| 1:18
| Tokyo, Japan
| 
|-
| Loss
| align=center| 2-5
| Erik Paulson
| Technical Submission (keylock)
| Shooto - Vale Tudo Perception
| 
| align=center| 1
| align=center| 0:44
| Setagaya, Tokyo, Japan
| 
|-
| Loss
| align=center| 2-4
| Naoki Sakurada
| Submission (heel hook)
| Shooto - Vale Tudo Access 4
| 
| align=center| 1
| align=center| 3:00
| Japan
| 
|-
| Loss
| align=center| 2-3
| Kenji Kawaguchi
| Submission (guillotine choke)
| Shooto - Shooto
| 
| align=center| 1
| align=center| 2:55
| Tokyo, Japan
| 
|-
| Loss
| align=center| 2-2
| Kazuhiro Kusayanagi
| Submission (armbar)
| Lumax Cup - Tournament of J '94
| 
| align=center| 1
| align=center| 1:01
| Japan
| 
|-
| Win
| align=center| 2-1
| Akihiro Gono
| Submission (toe hold)
| Lumax Cup - Tournament of J '94
| 
| align=center| 1
| align=center| 1:51
| Japan
| 
|-
| Win
| align=center| 1-1
| Yuji Fujita
| Submission (armbar)
| Shooto - Shooto
| 
| align=center| 1
| align=center| 0:25
| Tokyo, Japan
| 
|-
| Loss
| align=center| 0-1
| Yuji Ito
| TKO (retirement)
| Shooto - Shooto
| 
| align=center| 2
| align=center| 3:00
| Tokyo, Japan
|

See also
List of male mixed martial artists

References

External links
 
 Yasunori Okuda at mixedmartialarts.com

1972 births
Japanese male mixed martial artists
Middleweight mixed martial artists
Living people